Trachylepis lacertiformis, the bronze rock skink, is a species of skink found in Zimbabwe, Angola, Malawi, and Mozambique.

References

lacertiformis
Reptiles of Zimbabwe
Reptiles of Angola
Reptiles of Malawi
Reptiles of Mozambique
Reptiles described in 1854
Taxa named by Wilhelm Peters